Akershus is a county (fylke) in Norway.

Akershus may also refer to:

Places

Norway
 Akershus (Storting constituency), in the county of Viken
 Akershus County Municipality, the regional governing administration of Akershus county
 Akershus Fortress, a fortress and castle in downtown Oslo, Norway
 Akershus University College, a former university college in Kjeller, Akershus county, now merged with Oslo University College to create:
 Oslo and Akershus University College, in the city centre of Oslo
 Akershus University Hospital (Ahus), a Norwegian public university hospital in Lørenskog municipality, Akershus county

Other places
 Akershus Royal Banquet Hall and Restaurant Akershus at the Norway Pavilion at Epcot, Walt Disney World Resort, Florida
 Åkershus, Staffanstorp, an area of rental apartments in Staffanstorp Municipality, Skåne County, Sweden

Business organizations
 Akershus Amtstidende, a local newspaper published in Drøbak, Norway
 Akershus Energi, a Norwegian power company that produces hydroelectricity
 Akershus Kollektivterminaler FKF, a county agency responsible for major bus terminals in Akershus county